A list of Assamese language films produced by the film industry of Assam, India based in Guwahati and publicly released in the year 2014. Premiere shows and film festival screenings are not considered as releases for this list.

Scheduled releases

January - June

July - December

Notable deaths

Events

Award ceremonies

References 

2014
Assamese
Assamese